Jockins Atudo (born 8 August 1985 in Homa Bay) is a Kenyan footballer who plays for Kenyan Premier League club Tusker as a defender. He previously played for Sony Sugar and Tanzanian Premier League side Azam.

Atudo has also appeared for the Kenya national team, and was part of the squad that won the 2013 CECAFA Cup. He played the full 90 minutes in the final against Sudan, and was the team's joint top scorer of the tournament alongside Allan Wanga, having scored 3 goals from the penalty spot.

International career

International goals
Scores and results list Kenya's goal tally first.

References

External links
 
 
 

1985 births
Living people
Tusker F.C. players
Kenyan footballers
Kenya international footballers
Kenyan expatriate footballers
Expatriate footballers in Tanzania
Azam F.C. players
SoNy Sugar F.C. players
People from Homa Bay County
Association football defenders